Vermio may refer to:

 Vermio, Kozani, a small town in the regional unit of Kozani, Greece
 the Vermio Mountains, in Greece